William Wade MA (1672–1733) was a Canon of Windsor from 1720 to 1730.

Family

He was born in 1672, the son of Jerome Wade. His brother was General George Wade.

He died in 1733 in Bath.

Career

He was educated at Trinity College, Cambridge and graduated BA in 1694, MA in 1697.

He was appointed:
Prebendary of Chichester 1729

He was appointed to the tenth stall in St George's Chapel, Windsor Castle in 1720 and held the canonry until 1730.

Notes 

1672 births
1733 deaths
Canons of Windsor
Alumni of Trinity College, Cambridge